

Portugal
 Angola – António de Lencastre, Governor of Angola (1772–79)
 Macau – Diogo Fernandes Salema e Saldanha, Governor of Macau (1771–77)

Colonial governors
Colonial governors
1776